Andreas Barkoulis (4 August 1936 – 23 August 2016) was a Greek actor. He was among the most popular male actors of the 1950s and 1960s in Greece. He was considered such a heartthrob that a popular expression of the era was created for him: "Eh koritsia, o Barkoulis!" (Hey girls, it's Barkoulis!). He died on 23 August 2016 at the age of 80.

Films 
Love in the Sand-dunes co-starring Aliki Vougiouklaki
Siko Horepse Sirtaki ("Let's Dance the Sirtaki")
Tsakitzis, protector of the poor, in the leading role as Çakırcalı Mehmet Efe.

Roles

1950s 
  (1957) ..... Dimitris Tourkakis
  (1958) ..... Kostas
  (1958) ..... Giorgos
  (1958) ..... Mihalis Mimikos
  (1958) ..... Kostas
  (1958) ..... Nikos Makrygiannis
  (1958) ..... Evgenios Karmis
  (1958) ..... stranger
  (1958) ..... Jean
  (1959) ..... Dimitris
  (1959) ..... Sakis
  (1959) ..... Lakis Vranas
  (1959) ..... Andreas Dimopoulos
  (1959) ..... Giannos
  (1959) ..... Mouhtar
  (1959) ..... Antonis
  (1959) ..... Dimitris Floras
  (1959) ..... Georgios Drossinis

1960s 
  (1960) ..... Dimitris
 Moment of Passion (1960) ..... Nikos
  (1960) ..... Paris Semeritis
  (1960) ..... Tsakitzis
  (1960) ..... Andreas
  (1960) ..... Dimitris Razis
  (1960) ..... Petros
  (1960 ..... Giorgos
  (1960) ..... Giorgos
  (1960) ..... Theofilos
  (1961) ..... Mihalis Markezis
  (1961) ..... Dimos
  (1961) ..... Petros
  (1961) ..... Giorgis
  (1961) ..... Alkis
  (1962) ..... Dimitris Perotis
  (1962) ..... Fanis
  (1962) ..... Giorgos
  (1962) ..... Stefanos Gaitis
  (1962) ..... Liakos
  (1962) ..... Petros
  (1962) ..... narrator
  (1962) ..... Andreas Vladis
  (1962) ..... Petros
  (1963) ..... Kyriakos Vagias
  (1963) ..... Nikos
  (1963) ..... Kostas
  (1964) ..... cabaret customer
  (1964) ..... Dinos
  (1964) ..... Drosos
  (1964) ..... Akis
  (1966) ..... Nikos Mantas
  (1966) ..... El-Rassid
  (1966) ..... Fotis Dimitriou
  (1967) ..... Antonio
  (1967) ..... Giorgos Fylaktos
  (1967) ..... Dimitris Valaskos
  (1967) ..... Italian spy
  (1968) ..... Alekos
  (1968) ..... Kostas Dimou
  (1968) ..... Alexis Vrettos
  (1968) ..... Alekos Livas
  (1969) ..... Xenia's friend
  (1969) ..... Tasos Mandas
  (1969) ..... Thoris
  (1969) ..... Haris
  (1969) ..... Iasonas Zoumberis

1970s 
  (1970) ..... Angelos
  (1970) ..... Takis
  (1970) ..... Dimitris Rodanas
  (1970) ..... Stefanos Rokos
  (1970) ..... Stefanos Kriezis
  (1970) ..... narrator (uncredited)
  (1970) ..... Dinos Kaliabesis
  (1971) ..... police investigator
  (1971) ..... Haris
  (1971) ..... Angelos Floras
  (1971) ..... Jack
  (1971) ..... Nikos
 ' (1972) ..... Grekos
  (1972) .....  Wilhelm Kurt
  (1972) ..... Giorgos Stavrou
  (1972) ..... Vlahopoulos
  (1972) ..... Alexis Mourouzis
  (1973) ..... Seretis (as Andrew Calman)
  (1973) ..... Andy
  (1973) ..... Alexis Lismanis
  (1974) ..... Andreas
  (1976) ..... Kurt
  (1978) ..... Alkis

1980s 
  (1982) ..... Aris Platonas
  (1989) ..... Giorgos

References

External links 

1936 births
2016 deaths
20th-century Greek male actors
Greek male film actors
Actors from Piraeus